Mumbai Salsa is a 2007 Bollywood film directed by Manoj Tyagi.

Plot
Four pairs who meet accidentally in a Mumbai bar called Mumbai Salsa and get hooked on each other for life. The film captures the urban qualities of life and love.

Maya Chandhok lives a wealthy lifestyle in Delhi along with her parents. Refusing to buckle down to her mother's demands to get married, she re-locates to Kolkata, obtains her MBA, and then goes to reside in Mumbai where she gets a job in a bank, and shares a flat with two roommates, Zenobia and Neha. She meets with Sanjay and both fall in love. Then one day he dramatically and publicly dumps her. A few days later she meets with Rajeev Sharma, who is heartbroken after his fiancée, Pooja, dumped him to re-locate to America, and both are attracted to each other. She is delighted when he proposes to her, but her delight turns sour when he asks her to re-locate with him to Singapore, drop her career, and be a home-maker for the rest of her life. Maya must now make up her mind amidst chaos and heartbreak that also threaten to tear apart lives of both Neha and Zenobia, who are also dating Rajeev's friends, Karan Kapoor and Shaji, while conservative Tyagraj, Rajeev's pal, struggles with his feelings about a much liberated Caucasian co-worker, Pamela.

Cast
 Vir Das as Raj
 Linda Arsenio as Pamella
 Manjari Phadnis as Maya
 Amruta Khanvilkar as Neha
 Denzil Smith as Kay Kay
 Dilip Thadeshwar as Subbu
 Indraneil Sengupta as Karan
 Ray Irani as Shaji
 Neelam Chauhan as Xenobia
 Alisha Chinai

Music
"Akeli Hai Zindagi" - Shaan
"Friday" - Gayatri Iyer
"Friday (Female)" - Gayatri Iyer
"Lets Do The Mumbai Saalsa" - Adnan Sami, Alisha Chinai
"Pyar Se Aise Na Humme Dekho" - Amit Kumar
"Choti Si Iltaza" - Adnan Sami
"Mumbai Salsa (Female)" - Alisha Chinai
"Pyaar Se Aise Na Hume" - Shaan, Shreya Ghoshal
"Saalsa Instrumental" - Amit Kumar

References

External links
 

2007 films
Films set in Mumbai
2000s Hindi-language films
2007 directorial debut films